A boom barrier, also known as a boom gate, is a bar, or pole pivoted to allow the boom to block vehicular or pedestrian access through a controlled point. Typically, the tip of a boom gate rises in a vertical arc to a near vertical position. Boom gates are often counterweighted, so the pole is easily tipped. Boom gates are often paired either end to end, or offset appropriately to block traffic in both directions. Some boom gates also have a second arm which hangs 300 to 400 mm below the upper arm when lowered, to increase approach visibility, and which hangs on links, so it lies flat with the main boom as the barrier is raised. Some barriers also feature a pivot roughly half way, where as the barrier is raised, the outermost half remains horizontal, with the barrier resembling an upside-down L when raised.

Automatic boom barrier
There are various  technologies for an automatic boom barrier. One of them is electro-mechanical, which is  widely used due to its reliability. The other technologies are often manufacturer specific. These electro-mechanical devices come with 24-volt direct-current drive units which can run continuously without generating heat, so electro-mechanical boom barriers can be operated continuously and in an intensive duty cycle.

An automatic boom barrier can be operated through:
 Push button
 Remote control
 Radio-frequency identification (RFID) tags / RFID reader
 Loop detectors
 Opto-electronic sensors
 Automatic Number Plate Recognition System by Gaido Technologies

Usage

Boom gates are typically found at level crossings, drawbridges, parking facilities, checkpoints and entrances to restricted areas. They are also the usual method for controlling passage through toll booths, and can also be found on some freeway entrance ramps which are automatically controlled to drop to restrict traffic in the event of accident cleanup or road closures without the need to dispatch road workers or law enforcement to use a vehicle to block the way.
Some boom gates are automatic and powered; others are manually operated. Manual gates are sometimes hung in the manner of a normal gate (i.e. hinged horizontally). In some places, boom gates are installed across suburban streets as a traffic calming measure, preventing through traffic, while allowing authorised vehicles such as emergency services and buses to take advantage of the shorter and more direct route.

See also

 Automatic full barriers
 Toll collection technology

References

Street furniture
Level crossings
Protective barriers
Railway buildings and structures
English inventions
Road infrastructure
Traffic calming
Types of gates